The 9×19mm Parabellum (also known as 9mm Parabellum or 9mm Luger or simply 9mm) is a rimless, tapered firearms cartridge.

Originally designed by Austrian firearm designer Georg Luger in 1901, it is widely considered the most popular handgun and submachine gun cartridge due to its low cost and extensive availability.

Since the cartridge was designed for the Luger semi-automatic pistol, it has been given the designation of 9mm Luger by the Sporting Arms and Ammunition Manufacturers' Institute (SAAMI) and the Commission internationale permanente pour l'épreuve des armes à feu portatives (CIP).

A 2007 US survey concluded that "about 60 percent of the firearms in use by police are 9mm [Parabellum]" and credited 9×19mm Parabellum pistol sales with making semiautomatic pistols more popular than revolvers.

Origins
The cartridge was developed by Austrian firearm designer Georg Luger in 1901. The cartridge was derived from an earlier round designed by Luger (7.65×21mm Parabellum), which itself was derived from a cartridge used in the Borchardt C-93 pistol (7.65×25mm Borchardt). Shortening the length of the cartridge case used in the Borchardt pistol allowed Luger to improve the design of the toggle lock and to incorporate a smaller, angled grip.

Luger's work on the Borchardt design evolved into the Luger pistol, which was first patented in 1898 and chambered in 7.65×21mm Parabellum. Demand from Germany for a larger caliber in their military sidearm led Luger to develop the 9×19mm Parabellum cartridge for the eventual P08 pistol. This was achieved by removing the bottleneck shape of the 7.65×21mm Parabellum case, resulting in a tapered rimless cartridge encasing a bullet that was 9 millimeters in diameter.

In 1902, Luger presented the new round to the British Small Arms Committee, as well as three prototype versions to the U.S. Army for testing at Springfield Arsenal in mid-1903. The Imperial German Navy adopted the cartridge in 1904, and in 1908, the German Army adopted it as well.

To conserve lead during World War II in Germany, the lead core was replaced by an iron core encased with lead. This bullet, identified by a black bullet jacket, was designated as the 08 mE (—"with an iron core"). By 1944, the black jacket of the 08 mE bullet was dropped, and these bullets were produced with normal copper-colored jackets. Another wartime variation was designated the 08 sE bullet and identified by its dark gray jacket, and was created by compressing iron powder at high temperature into a solid material (—"sintered iron").

The name Parabellum is derived from the Latin motto of Deutsche Waffen- und Munitionsfabriken (DWM), Si vis pacem, para bellum ("If you want peace, prepare for war").

Popularity
After World War I, acceptance of the 9×19mm Parabellum cartridge increased, and 9×19mm Parabellum pistols and submachine guns were adopted by military and police users in many countries. The 9×19mm Parabellum has become the most popular caliber for U.S. law enforcement agencies, primarily due to the availability of compact pistols with large magazine capacities that use the cartridge.

From the 1980s to the 1990s, a sharp increase occurred in the popularity of semi-automatic pistols in the U.S., a trend foreshadowed by the adoption of the Smith & Wesson Model 39 by the Illinois State Police in 1968. In addition, the Beretta M9 (a military version of the Beretta Model 92) was adopted by the U.S. Army in 1985. Previously, most American police departments issued .38 Special caliber revolvers with a six-shot capacity. The .38 Special was preferred to other weapons, such as variants of the M1911, because it offered low recoil, was small and light enough to accommodate different shooters, and was inexpensive. The 9×19mm cartridge is ballistically superior to the .38 Special revolver cartridge, is shorter overall, and being an autoloader cartridge, it is stored in flat magazines, as opposed to cylindrical speedloaders. This, coupled with the advent of the so-called "wonder nines", led to many U.S. police departments exchanging their revolvers for some form of 9mm semiautomatic pistols by the late 20th century.

In 2013, a chart of popular calibers that was released by the website Luckygunner.com showed 9×19mm Parabellum as having 21.4% of the entire cartridge market, followed by the .223 Remington at 10.2% (with 5.56 mm included this is 15.7%). The next most popular caliber was .45 ACP.

Cartridge dimensions

The 9×19mm Parabellum has 0.86 ml (13.3 grains H2O) of cartridge case capacity.

9×19mm Parabellum maximum CIP cartridge dimensions: All sizes are given in millimeters (mm).

The cartridge headspaces on the mouth of the case: The common rifling twist rate for this cartridge is 250 mm (1 in 9.84 in), six grooves, ø lands = 8.82 mm, ø grooves = 9.02 mm, land width = 2.49 mm and the primer type is small pistol.

According to CIP rulings, the 9×19mm Parabellum cartridge case can handle up to  Pmax piezo pressure. In CIP-regulated countries, every pistol cartridge combination has to be proofed at 130% of this maximum CIP pressure to certify for sale to consumers. This means that 9×19mm Parabellum chambered arms in CIP-regulated countries are currently (2014) proof tested at  PE piezo pressure.

The SAAMI pressure limit for the 9×19mm Parabellum is set at  piezo pressure.

Performance

The 9×19mm Parabellum cartridge combines a flat trajectory with moderate recoil. According to the 1986 book Handloading, "the modern science of wound ballistics has established beyond reasonable doubt that the 9mm cartridge is highly effective."

In 2014, the United States Federal Bureau of Investigation (FBI) released a report detailing the potential combat effectiveness of the 9×19mm Parabellum cartridge when compared to other calibers such as the .40 S&W and the .45 ACP cartridges that were specifically developed for use by the FBI. The report indicated that the new powders and more advanced bullet designs used in current 9×19mm Parabellum defensive loads allowed for the caliber to deliver similar performance to other calibers, like the .40 S&W and .45 ACP. In addition to this, the lower recoil, less wear, cheaper ammunition, and higher capacity were all reasons that the report cited for the recent surge in orders of the ammunition from various police agencies. With a wider selection of officers able to shoot handguns chambered in 9×19mm Parabellum, many departments chose this caliber to standardize a single firearm and loading, making logistics and supply easier. Due to all these factors, law enforcement orders of 9×19mm Parabellum ammunition from all major ammunition manufacturers have risen significantly.

Improvements and variations

NATO standard
The 9mm is called NATO because it has become a standard pistol caliber for NATO and other military forces worldwide.  The cartridge has been manufactured by, or for, more than 70 countries and has become a standard pistol caliber for NATO and other military forces around the world. Its official nomenclature among NATO members is "9mm NATO".

9mm NATO can be considered an overpressure variant of 9×19mm Parabellum that is defined by NATO standards.

While the NATO standards do not specify the type of bullet to be used, Declaration III of the Hague Convention of 1899 prohibits the use of expanding ammunition in warfare by signatories, so official NATO 9mm ammunition is FMJ "ball" bullets. Declaration III does not apply in conflicts involving non-signatories to the Hague Convention, including paramilitary and other nongovernmental fighting forces.

Swedish m/39

Red. Bo Kjellander s. 259–260.</ref>
During the Congo Crisis, the Swedish UN-contingent issued complaints about the performance of the m/39 cartridge (regular 9mm Parabellum) used. This resulted in a commission of the Swedish Army establishing in 1962 that a new round was needed for the Carl Gustav m/45. The resulting m/39B had a tombac-plated steel jacket surrounding the lead core. The mantle also acts like a penetrator when striking a target, going through up to 50 layers of kevlar, 7 cm of bricks, or 25 cm of wood, allowing the bullet to defeat body armor up to Type IIIA.

+P variant

Attempts to improve the cartridge's ballistics came in the early 1990s with the widespread availability of high-pressure loadings of the 9mm cartridge. Such overpressure cartridges are labeled "+P" (38,500 psi) or in the case of very high pressure loadings, "+P+" (42,000 psi). Velocity of these rounds is improved over standard loadings. In addition, improvements in jacketed hollow-point bullet technology have produced bullet designs that are more likely to expand and less likely to fragment than earlier iterations, giving a 9mm bullet better terminal effectiveness.

SESAMS

SESAMS weapons or components are normally painted blue or marked to denote their inert status and avoid a potentially catastrophic mixup with live-fire weapons. This allows the armed forces to train with nearly identical equipment as used in real-life situations.

Russian military overpressure variants
The Russian military has developed specialized 9×19mm cartridges that use relatively light bullets at high muzzle velocities for both pistols and submachine guns to defeat body armor.

Besides enhanced penetration capabilities, these overpressure variants offer a flatter trajectory and lessened recoil. The increase in service pressure causes a rise in bolt thrust, so this overpressure ammunition induces more stress on critical weapon parts during firing. After initial research conducted in the late 1980s under the codename "Grach", the Russian armed forces adopted two specialized 9×19mm variants.

The 7N21 bullet features a hardened (sub-caliber) steel penetrator core, enclosed by a bimetal jacket. The space between the core and jacket is filled with polyethylene, and the tip of the penetrator is exposed at the front of the bullet to achieve better penetration. The MP-443 Grach and GSh-18 pistols and PP-19 Vityaz, PP-90M1 and PP-2000 submachine guns were designed for use with this overpressure cartridge. Jane's Infantry Weapons stated in 2003 that the 7N21 cartridge combined the 9×19mm Parabellum dimensions with a 9×21mm Gyurza bullet design and was developed specifically for the penetration of body armor and for the MP-443 Grach pistol, the latest Russian service pistol.

The 7N31 (Cyrillic: 7Н31) / PBP 9×19mm overpressure variant uses the same concept with a similar but lighter bullet that achieves higher muzzle velocity. The 7N31 cartridge was developed in the late 1990s for the GSh-18 pistol. The 7N31 was adopted for the PP-90M1 and PP-2000 submachine guns. Its maximum service pressure remains unclear.

The construction of the two rounds allows them to be effective against both unarmored and armored targets. If the bullet strikes an unarmored target, it holds together to produce a wide wound channel. If the bullet strikes an armored target, the sleeve is stripped away, and the core penetrates alone. The disadvantage of the rounds is that high impact velocities are needed to work effectively, so the bullets are relatively light to maximize their muzzle velocity. This means they lose velocity relatively quickly, limiting their effective range.

Other variants
VBR-B produces specialized bullets for this cartridge, a two-part controlled fragmenting projectile and an armor-piercing bullet that features a brass sabot and a hardened steel penetrator. These are designed to increase the content of the permanent wound cavity and double the chance of hitting a vital organ.

U.S. data
The energy delivered by most 9mm loads allows for significant expansion and penetration with premium hollow-point bullets. Massad Ayoob has stated that the "Tried, Tested, and True"  +P or +P+ is the best self-defense load in this caliber. Proponents of the hydrostatic shock theory contend that the energy of the 9mm cartridge is capable of imparting remote wounding effects in human-sized living targets.Sturtevant B, Shock Wave Effects in Biomechanics, Sadhana, 23: 579–596, 1998.Key:Expansion: expanded bullet diameter (ballistic gelatin)Penetration: penetration depth (ballistic gelatin)PC: permanent cavity volume (ballistic gelatin, FBI method)TSC'': temporary stretch cavity volume (ballistic gelatin)

See also
 9 mm caliber
 List of firearms
 List of handgun cartridges
 List of rifle cartridges
 Table of handgun and rifle cartridges

References

External links

 Article on 9×19 mm Parabellum cartridge collecting including history with photos and descriptions of variations including headstamps
 Ballistics By The Inch 9×19 mm Parabellum Results.
 Data on the Russian ammo (in Russian)
 DIRECT FIRE AMMUNITION Handbook 2021, Project Manager Maneuver Ammunition Systems

Weapons and ammunition introduced in 1902
9mm Parabellum firearms
Pistol and rifle cartridges
Military cartridges
NATO cartridges
German inventions
1902 establishments in Germany